Jordan Patrick McKay Farquharson (born 21 February 2000) is a Bahamian footballer who plays for Western Warriors SC and the Bahamas national football team.

Club career
In July 2015, Farquharson went to Scotland to spend two weeks training with Dundee United.

International career
In July 2016, Farquharson scored the lone goal for Bahamas U17s in a 2–1 defeat to Suriname U17s in U17 World Cup Qualifying. In May 2018, Farquharson was named in the 40-man training squad for the Bahamas' CONCACAF Nations League qualifying campaign. Farquharson made his senior international debut on 7 September 2018 in a 4–0 away defeat to Belize during CONCACAF Nations League qualifying.

References

External links

Profile at CONCACAF Nations League

2000 births
Living people
Bahamian footballers
Bahamas international footballers
Association football midfielders